was a village located in Tone District, Gunma Prefecture, Japan.

On October 1, 2005, Niihari, along with the town of Tsukiyono (also from Tone District), was merged into the expanded town of Minakami.

Dissolved municipalities of Gunma Prefecture